Marcel Granollers and Rajeev Ram were the defending champions,  but chose to compete with different partners. Granollers played alongside Horacio Zeballos, but lost in the second round to Jamie Murray and Neal Skupski. Ram teamed up with Joe Salisbury, but lost in the quarterfinals to Ivan Dodig and Filip Polášek.

Pierre-Hugues Herbert and Nicolas Mahut won the title, defeating Karen Khachanov and Andrey Rublev in the final, 6–4, 6–1.

Seeds

Draw

Finals

Top half

Bottom half

References

External Links
 Main Draw

Doubles